Sormidomorpha is a monotypic beetle genus in the family Cerambycidae described by Per Olof Christopher Aurivillius in 1920. Its single species, Sormidomorpha unicolor, was described by the same author in the same year.

References

Desmiphorini
Beetles described in 1920
Monotypic beetle genera